The 2022 Nordic Golf League was the 24th season of the Nordic Golf League (NGL), one of four third-tier tours recognized by the European Tour. The schedule was mainly a combination of events organized by the Danish Golf Tour (titled as the ECCO Tour for sponsorship reasons) and the Swedish Golf Tour (titled as the More Golf Mastercard Tour for sponsorship reasons).

Schedule
The following table lists official events during the 2022 season.

Order of Merit
The Order of Merit was titled as the GolfBox Road to Europe and was based on prize money won during the season, calculated using a points-based system. The top five players on the tour (not otherwise exempt) earned status to play on the 2023 Challenge Tour.

See also
2022 Danish Golf Tour
2022 Swedish Golf Tour

Notes

References

Nordic Golf League